"Panopticom" is a song by English musician Peter Gabriel. It is set to be released on Gabriel's upcoming album i/o, his first album of original material since 2002's Up, and is his first single since 2016's "The Veil". Two versions of the song have been released: the "Bright Side Mix" (mixed by Mark "Spike" Stent) on January 6, 2023, and the "Dark Side Mix" (mixed by Tchad Blake) on January 21. The cover (for both versions) features David Spriggs' Red Gravity as the cover art. Recorded at Gabriel's Real World Studios in Wiltshire and the Beehive in London, "Panopticom" features frequent collaborators Tony Levin on bass, David Rhodes on guitar, Manu Katché on drums, and Brian Eno on synthesizer and bells. Additionally, Ríoghnach Connolly (of folk duo The Breath) contributes backing vocals. The single was released on the first full moon of the year. Gabriel has stated that additional tracks from the album will also be released on full moons and receive both "bright side" and "dark side" mixes by Stent and Blake, respectively.

Of the origin of the song, Gabriel stated:  Additionally, Gabriel cited research group Forensic Architecture, investigative journalism group Bellingcat, and the non-profit human rights organization WITNESS (co-founded by Gabriel) as inspirations.

Personnel

Peter Gabriel – lead and backing vocals, synthesizers, rhythm programming, production
Tony Levin – bass guitar
David Rhodes – electric guitar, backing vocals
Manu Katché – drums
Brian Eno – synthesizer, bells
Katie May – acoustic guitar
Richard Chappell – rhythm programming
Oli Jacobs – rhythm programming, synthesizers
Ríoghnach Connolly – backing vocals

References

2023 singles
2023 songs
Peter Gabriel songs
EMI Records singles
Republic Records singles